Raymond Joseph Michael O'Hurley,  (October 1, 1909 – March 27, 1970) was a Canadian politician.

Born in St-Gilles, Quebec, he was first elected to the House of Commons of Canada in 1957 for the Quebec riding of Lotbinière. A Progressive Conservative, he was re-elected in 1958 and 1962. He was defeated in 1963 and 1965. From 1957 to 1958, he was the Parliamentary Assistant to the Minister of Mines and Technical Surveys. From 1958 to 1963, he was the Minister of Defence Production.

References
 

1909 births
1970 deaths
Members of the House of Commons of Canada from Quebec
Members of the King's Privy Council for Canada
Progressive Conservative Party of Canada MPs